Tara Leigh Patrick (born April 20, 1972), known professionally as Carmen Electra, is an American actress, model, singer, and media personality. She began her career as a singer after moving to Minneapolis, where she met Prince, who produced her self-titled debut studio album, released in 1993. Electra began glamour modeling in 1996 with appearances in Playboy magazine, before relocating to Los Angeles, where she had her breakthrough portraying Lani McKenzie in the action drama series Baywatch (1997–1998).

In 1997, Electra hosted the MTV dating show Singled Out and made her film debut in the comedy horror American Vampire. In 2004, she co-starred in the reality series 'Til Death Do Us Part: Carmen and Dave with her then-husband Dave Navarro, and voiced Six in the animated series Tripping the Rift. Electra later achieved recognition for her work in parody films, including Scary Movie (2000), Scary Movie 4 (2006), Date Movie (2006), Epic Movie (2007), Meet the Spartans (2008), and Disaster Movie (2008). Her other film credits include Get Over It (2001), Starsky & Hutch (2004), Cheaper by the Dozen 2 (2005), Dirty Love (2005), Hot Tamale (2006), and I Want Candy (2007).

Electra has also occasionally worked as a dancer, most notably with The Pussycat Dolls, as a featured guest of the group on VH1 Divas 2004. She has been considered a "sex symbol" and "pop culture icon".

Early life
Tara Leigh Patrick was born on April 20, 1972, in Sharonville, Ohio, (a Cincinnati suburb) to Harry Patrick, a guitarist and entertainer, and his wife Patricia (d. 1998), a singer. Electra attended Ann Weigel Elementary School and studied dance under Gloria J. Simpson at Dance Artists studio in Western Hills until age 9, when she enrolled in the School for Creative and Performing Arts (SCPA), a magnet arts school in the Cincinnati Public School District. There, she was an older classmate of Nick Lachey, with whom she appeared in a production of Peter Pan.

Electra, who told People in 1997 that she had "wanted to dance on Broadway," graduated from Princeton High School in Sharonville in 1990, having transferred there from SCPA two years prior. Additionally, Electra attended and graduated from Barbizon Modeling and Acting School in Cincinnati.

Electra claims to be of Cherokee, German, and Irish descent, and was very close to her family. She said of her mother, "My mom was my rock," and described her older sister Debbie as being "like a second mother to me". After Debbie moved to Illinois, Electra said her life "revolved around my mom. She was my best friend, in my life 24/7 whether I wanted her there or not."

Career
Electra started her professional career in 1990 as a dancer at Kings Island in Mason, Ohio, performing in the show "It's Magic", one of the more popular shows in the park's history. In 1991, she moved to Minneapolis, Minnesota, where she met singer and songwriter Prince. Soon after, Electra signed a recording contract with Prince's Paisley Park Records and made her singing debut with her self-titled debut studio album in 1993, and would be her only album release. During her time at Paisley Park Records, she officially became known as Carmen Electra.

In May 1996, she was featured in a nude pictorial in Playboy magazine, the first of several. Electra was featured in Playboy four more times: June 1997, December 2000, April 2003, and the January 2009 anniversary issue. She was on the cover of the last three of these issues.

Electra moved to Los Angeles, where she made her acting debut in the independent comedy horror film American Vampire (1997). In 1997 she was cast as Lani McKenzie in the American drama series Baywatch, for which she achieved her breakthrough. The role lasted a year and helped to establish her as a sex symbol, which has lasted since the late 1990s and the 2000s. In the same year, she began hosting MTV's Singled Out.

In 1999, she appeared in the Bloodhound Gang's music video of "The Inevitable Return of the Great White Dope". That same year she appeared in the film The Mating Habits of the Earthbound Human.

In 2000, Electra starred in the horror-comedy parody film Scary Movie as Drew Decker, a character parodied after Casey Becker from Scream (1996). The film was a commercial success, and spawned the Scary Movie franchise which attained a cult following. She later starred as Holly in Scary Movie 4 (2006), the fourth film in the franchise, which holds the box-office record for the best opening on Easter weekend. Electra reprised the role of Lani McKenzie in the 2003 television film Baywatch: Hawaiian Wedding.

In 2004, she appeared in the remake of the 1970s TV show Starsky & Hutch (2004), which was a commercial success. For the role, she won an MTV Movie Award for Best Kiss. Electra appeared as characters in the video game Def Jam: Fight for New York and as one of the celebrity challenges in the video game ESPN NFL 2K5, both also in 2004.

In 2005, Electra starred in the family comedy film Cheaper by the Dozen 2, which received negative reviews from critics, although it was a moderate box-office success and Electra's performance was praised, with Andrea Gronvall of The Chicago Reader writing that she was "the most winning performer of the bunch". Also in 2005, she appeared in an episode of House in which she portrayed herself as an injured golfer and farmer. That same year, she joined the voice cast of the animated series Tripping the Rift, replacing Gina Gershon as the voice of the android "Six".

In 2006 she appeared in Date Movie. She occasionally performed with The Pussycat Dolls, most notably as a featured guest of the group when they shared the stage with artists like Patti LaBelle and Debbie Harry on VH1 Divas 2004.

In 2007, she became a published author with the release of her book, How to Be Sexy. Electra continued to appear in parody films, most notably Epic Movie in 2007, and Meet the Spartans and Disaster Movie in 2008. She was featured in some video spoofs of lonelygirl15 that advertised Epic Movie. Aside from Epic Movie, all of these films were commercial successes.

Electra appeared as a guest judge on So You Think You Can Dance Season 8 on July 6, 2011.  She appeared along with regular series judges Nigel Lythgoe and Mary Murphy and fellow guest judge Travis Wall.

In 2012, Electra joined Britain's Got Talent as a guest judge for the auditions staged in London. She acted as a replacement for Amanda Holden, who was absent due to complications following child birth.

Public image 

Electra is often spotlighted for her looks and has been considered a "sex symbol" and "pop culture icon".

Electra organized a fundraiser for Head to Hollywood, a non-profit organization which offers support to brain tumor survivors. Other charities which she supports include Elevate Hope, a charity which supports abused and abandoned children, and the HollyRod Foundation, which provides medical, physical, and emotional support to those suffering from debilitating life circumstances, especially Parkinson's disease.

She has modeled for the covers of the comic books Razor and the Ladies of London Night by London Night Studios. In 1997, Electra appeared as the face and spokesperson for Max Factor cosmetics in their television and print ads. From 2004 to 2005, she appeared in commercials for Maxim Men's Hair Color products.

In 2002, an extinct species of fly was named Carmenelectra shechisme in honor of Electra's "splendid somal structure".

In 2005, she began the Naked Women's Wrestling League, acting as the commissioner for the professional wrestling promotion. She also frequently appeared in Taco Bell commercials beginning from the same year.

In 2006, Electra signed on as the spokesmodel for Ritz Camera Centers, appearing in their television and print ads with CEO David Ritz. She is the oldest cover girl in the publication history of FHM Magazine.

In 2019, The Golden Banana, a strip club which is located in Peabody, Massachusetts, used Electra's likeness on social media without her consent, which led her, among other celebrities whose likenesses were also used without their permission, to launch a legal battle against the establishment.

In 2020, after Electra appeared on the critically acclaimed sports documentary miniseries The Last Dance, where she discussed her short-lived relationship with Dennis Rodman. Pornographic video site Pornhub reported that her name was searched on the site more than 1.7 million times, much more opposed to the 150,000 average searches her name received previously.

In 2022, Electra created an OnlyFans account, stating "I, for once, have this opportunity to be my own boss and have my own creative vision to share with my fans without someone standing over me".

Personal life

In August 1998, Electra's mother died of brain cancer, and two weeks later, her older sister, Debbie, died of a heart attack. During this time, Electra had been dating NBA star Dennis Rodman. She and Rodman wed in November 1998 at Little Chapel of the Flowers in Las Vegas, Nevada. Nine days later, Rodman filed for annulment, claiming he was of "unsound mind" when the pair wed.  Electra explained, "It's easy to get caught up in a moment. You think it's romantic, but then you realize, God, we did it in Vegas? It's like getting a cheeseburger at a fast-food restaurant." The couple reconciled and celebrated New Year's Eve together, but four months later they mutually agreed to end their marriage in April 1999 under "amicable circumstances".

In November 1999, Electra and Rodman were arrested for misdemeanor battery after police were notified of a domestic dispute at a Miami Beach hotel. They were released on $2,500 bail each and ordered to stay away from each other. The charges were eventually dropped. Five years later, Electra gave an interview to Glamour in which she admitted that she married Rodman in 1998 in direct response to the numbing emotional pain of having lost both her mother and sister: "I was just going through the motions. I was completely numb. At the time, I was dating Dennis Rodman. He was such a fun person to be around, and we went out every night. I remember thinking, this is my out. I'm just going to have fun, and I'm not going to worry about anything. Right after my mom and sister died, I flew to Las Vegas and Dennis and I got married. I guess I was trying to cling to whatever I had. I'd lost my mom and my sister; I didn't want to lose anyone else."

On November 22, 2003, Electra married Dave Navarro, lead guitarist for the rock band Jane's Addiction. The couple documented their courtship and marriage in an MTV reality television show called 'Til Death Do Us Part: Carmen and Dave. On July 17, 2006, she and Navarro announced their separation, and Electra filed for divorce on August 10, 2006; it was finalized on February 20, 2007.

In April 2008, Electra's representative confirmed that she was engaged to Rob Patterson, a member of the nu metal band Otep and hard rock band Filter. Despite remaining engaged for several years,  the couple did not wed and in 2012, she appeared as one of the celebrity bachelorettes on the TV dating show The Choice.

Filmography

Film

Television

Video games

Music videos

Discography

Studio albums

Singles

Bibliography 
 How to Be Sexy (2007) (self-help book)

Awards and nominations

References

External links

 
 
 
 
 
 
 

1972 births
Living people
People from Sharonville, Ohio
Actresses from Cincinnati
American women singers
American women rappers
American film actresses
American television actresses
American video game actresses
American voice actresses
Paisley Park Records artists
American game show hosts
Musicians from Cincinnati
Participants in American reality television series
Professional wrestling executives
20th-century American actresses
21st-century American actresses
21st-century American rappers
21st-century American women musicians
21st-century women rappers